Bogumiła Berdychowska-Szostakowska (born 10 January 1964) is a Polish writer and journalist, often writing about the Polish minorities in the former USSR and their history.

She was the director of the Bureau of National Minorities in the Polish Ministry of Art and Culture (1989–1994), and the vice-director of Polskie Radio (1994–2002). Since 2003, she has been the Director of the stipends department in Narodowe Centrum Kultury (National Center of Culture). She was in charge of coordinating the Polish-Ukrainian youth exchange. Author of publications in Tygodnik Powszechny and Więzi, among others. In 2014, she co-founded and was a member of the Civic Committee for Solidarity with Ukraine (KOSzU).

Berdychowska is also a member of the  Civic Committee of the Solidarity with Ukraine (KOSzU).

Awards 
 Order of Princess Olga, 3rd class (Ukraine, 2009)
Antonovych prize (2010)
Order of Polonia Restituta, Officer's Cross (2012)

Works
 "Juszczenko", Tygodnik Powszechny, Nr 18, 6 May 2001

References

1967 births
Living people
Polish journalists
Polish women journalists
Ukrainianists
Officers of the Order of Polonia Restituta
Recipients of the Order of Princess Olga, 3rd class
John Paul II Catholic University of Lublin alumni
People associated with the magazine "Kultura"